Lucicolpodes is a genus of ground beetles in the family Carabidae. There are at least 20 described species in Lucicolpodes, found in southern and eastern Asia.

Species
These 20 species belong to the genus Lucicolpodes:

 Lucicolpodes deuvei Morvan, 2010  (Nepal)
 Lucicolpodes eberti (Jedlicka, 1965)  (India and Nepal)
 Lucicolpodes gingko (J.Schmidt, 2000)  (China)
 Lucicolpodes kira J.Schmidt, 2009  (Nepal)
 Lucicolpodes lotos (J.Schmidt, 2000)  (Myanmar)
 Lucicolpodes lucens (Andrewes, 1947)  (Myanmar)
 Lucicolpodes macropus (Andrewes, 1947)  (Myanmar)
 Lucicolpodes mandarin (J.Schmidt, 2000)  (China)
 Lucicolpodes obsoletus (Louwerens, 1953)  (India)
 Lucicolpodes orchis (J.Schmidt, 2000)  (China and Myanmar)
 Lucicolpodes panda (J.Schmidt, 2000)  (China)
 Lucicolpodes pavo (J.Schmidt, 2000)  (Myanmar)
 Lucicolpodes raja (J.Schmidt, 2000)  (Nepal)
 Lucicolpodes rani J.Schmidt, 2009  (Nepal)
 Lucicolpodes rhododendron (J.Schmidt, 2000)  (China)
 Lucicolpodes sciakyi J.Schmidt, 2009  (Vietnam)
 Lucicolpodes tragopan (J.Schmidt, 2000)  (Myanmar)
 Lucicolpodes utheinaungi J.Schmidt, 2009  (Myanmar)
 Lucicolpodes vivax (Andrewes, 1947)  (China and Myanmar)
 Lucicolpodes wrasei J.Schmidt, 2009  (Myanmar)

References

Platyninae